Kole-Kalyan was a station on the Salsette–Trombay Railway serving the East Indian village of Kole-Kalyan, now known as Kalina. It was dismantled after the rail line closed down in 1934.
The words Kole-Kalyan mean the homes of jackals, foxes and wolves which at one time roamed these areas in large numbers freely.

References
Irfca.org
Mumbai Mirror, 25 Oct 2005, Manoj R Nair

Defunct railway stations in Mumbai